T. S. Sims was a college football player.

Alabama
Sims was a prominent guard for the Alabama Crimson White of the University of Alabama.

1905
Sims scored in the opening win of 17 to 0 over Maryville in 1905. A number of Alabama turnovers kept the game scoreless through halftime. Sims scored the first touchdown and Auxford Burks added a 95-yard return for a touchdown. Sims also scored the first touchdown of the 30 to 0 victory over Auburn in what was then the largest crowd ever to see a game in Birmingham (4,000) with an 18-yard run. He was selected All-Southern in 1905.

1906
In 1906, Auburn protested he was an illegal player. The protest was heard by the Southern Intercollegiate Athletic Association, but it was denied.

References

Players of American football from Birmingham, Alabama
All-Southern college football players
Alabama Crimson Tide football players
American football guards